Byrsonima intermedia is a species of plant in the Malpighiaceae family. It is found in Brazil and Paraguay.

References

External links
 
 

intermedia